Not Strictly Rubens is the second soundtrack album by Praga Khan. It was released in 2003 and performed by The Royal Ballet of Flanders.

Track listing
 "The Creator" – 3:49	
 "Fulfillment / Disappointement" – 4:54	
 "Female Shapes" – 2:35	
 "Revealing Women" – 2:33	
 "We Will Not" – 4:55	
 "Duet" – 5:27	
 "Receive the Light" – 5:24	
 "The Common People" – 5:41	
 "Garden of E." – 7:40	
 "The Key to the Kingdom" – 7:16

References

2003 soundtrack albums
Praga Khan albums
Theatre soundtracks